Jo Tong-sop (born May 1, 1959) is a North Korean football manager and former player. He was most recently the head coach of the North Korea national football team. It was his second stint in charge of the national team, having previously managed North Korea from 2010 to 2011, replacing Kim Jong-hun, who led the team to the 2010 FIFA World Cup.

Playing career
Jo Tong-sop was a player before becoming a coach. He was part of the North Korean team that won the 1986 King's Cup against Aarhus Gymnastikforening. His playing career lasted 20 years before he retired.

Coaching career
Jo Tong-sop was the coach of the national youth team and an assistant coach to the 2010 World Cup national team. He led the North Korean national youth football team to victory in the 2010 AFC U-19 Championship for their third title. As assistant coach to the national team he won the 2010 AFC Challenge Cup which let North Korea qualify for the 2011 Asian Cup. During the 2010 AFC Challenge Cup he attributed North Korea's draw to Turkmenistan to the high temperature. His first game as coach of the national team was a loss to the Kuwait national team during a friendly game in Egypt. His first victory with the team was a 1-0 win against Qatar in Doha. He coached the national team during the 2011 Asian Cup, and the first game ended in a draw against the UAE national team. Later in the cup, North Korea lost to Iran and Iraq. He also led North Korea at 2015 AFC Asian Cup and they were eliminated again in group stages after three loses against Uzbekistan, Saudi Arabia and China.

References

1959 births
Living people
North Korean football managers
North Korea national football team managers
2011 AFC Asian Cup managers
2015 AFC Asian Cup managers